Don "Midnight" Miller (March 29, 1902 – July 28, 1979) was an American football player and coach.  He was one of the famous "Four Horsemen" of the University of Notre Dame's backfield in 1924, when the Fighting Irish won the 1924 National Title. Miller was inducted into the College Football Hall of Fame as a player in 1970.

Playing career
Miller's three brothers attended Notre Dame before him.  The most famous of these being Harry "Red" Miller, captain of the 1908 squad.  Notre Dame head coach Knute Rockne called Miller "the greatest open field runner I ever had."

In 2002, the NCAA published "NCAA Football's Finest," researched and compiled by the NCAA Statistics Service.  For Miller they published the following statistics:

Coaching career
After his playing career, Miller coached at several colleges, including Georgia Tech and Ohio State.  He became the head football coach of St. Xavier High School of Louisville, Kentucky in 1934.

Law career
Miller eventually quit coaching and practiced law, in which he was successful in the Cleveland area. In 1925, he played professional football for the then-independent Hartford Blues.

On February 5, 1957, Miller appeared on To Tell the Truth.

References

External links
 
 

1902 births
1979 deaths
American football halfbacks
American men's basketball players
Georgia Tech Yellow Jackets football coaches
Hartford Blues players
Notre Dame Fighting Irish football players
Notre Dame Fighting Irish men's basketball players
Ohio State Buckeyes football coaches
High school football coaches in Kentucky
College Football Hall of Fame inductees
Sportspeople from Cleveland
People from Defiance, Ohio
Players of American football from Cleveland
Basketball players from Cleveland